The 1893 New Hampshire football team was an American football team that represented New Hampshire College of Agriculture and the Mechanic Arts during the 1893 college football season—the school became the University of New Hampshire in 1923. This was the first year that the college fielded a football team, which lost the only game it played.

Schedule
Scoring during this era awarded 4 points for a touchdown, 2 points for a conversion kick (extra point), and 5 points for a field goal. Teams played in the one-platoon system and the forward pass was not yet legal. Games were played in two halves rather than four quarters.

Game summary

 Date: November 4, 1893
 Game weather: Rain
 Referee: G. L. Teeple of Durham
 Umpire: C. S. Haley of Newmarket

Scoring
First half
 Newmarket – Mellows run (Mellows kick failed). NHC 0, Newmarket 4
Second half
 Newmarket – Griffin run (Mellows kick good). NHC 0, Newmarket 10

Time: 40 minutes

NHC roster: Whittemore (C), Forrestal (RG), Sprague (RT), Brown (RE), Wiggin (LG), Russell (LT), Shattuck (LE), Roberts (QB), Howe (HB), Janvrin (HB), Demeritte (FB)

Newmarket roster: Barrett (C), Simpson (RG), G. Evans (RT), P. Griffin (RE), Walker (LG), Kennedy (LT), Maguire (LE), Haley (QB), W. Evans (HB), M. Griffin (HB), Mellows (FB)

Source:

Notes

References

New Hampshire
New Hampshire Wildcats football seasons
College football winless seasons
New Hampshire football